The Barail Range is a tertiary mountain range in Northeast India with an area of approximately 80,000 ha between Brahmaputra and Barak basins stretching from Nagaland & Manipur to the east and Assam & Meghalaya to the west.

References

Mountain ranges of India
Geography of Assam
Geography of Meghalaya
Geography of Manipur
Geography of Nagaland